The Union of Indonesian Baptist Churches  is a Baptist Christian denomination in Indonesia. It is affiliated with the Baptist World Alliance. The headquarters is in Jakarta.

History
The Union of Indonesian Baptist Churches has its origins in a mission of three missionaries who were expelled from China and came to Jakarta in 1951.  It is officially founded in 1973.  According to a denomination census released in 2020, it claimed 648 churches and 45,450 members.

See also 
 Bible
 Born again
 Baptist beliefs
 Worship service (evangelicalism)
 Jesus Christ
 Believers' Church

References

External links
 Official Website

Baptist denominations in Asia
Evangelicalism in Indonesia